Binibining Pilipinas 2014 was the 51st edition of the Binibining Pilipinas. It was held at the Smart Araneta Coliseum in Quezon City, Metro Manila, Philippines on March 30, 2014.

At the end of the event, Ariella Arida crowned Mary Jean Lastimosa as Miss Universe Philippines 2014, Bea Santiago crowned Bianca Guidotti as Binibining Pilipinas International 2014, Mutya Johanna Datul crowned Yvethe Marie Santiago as Binibining Pilipinas Supranational 2014, and Cindy Miranda crowned Parul Shah as Binibining Pilipinas Tourism 2014. A new title, Binibining Pilipinas Intercontinental 2014, was awarded by Melanie Marquez to Kris Tiffany Janson. Laura Lehmann was named First Runner-Up and Hannah Ruth Sison was named Second Runner-Up.

Prior to the pageant night, a special primer called Binibining Pilipinas: Road to the Crown was aired on ABS-CBN on March 23, 2014.

Results
Color keys
  The contestant was a Runner-up in an International pageant.
  The contestant was a Semi-Finalist in an International pageant.
  The contestant did not place.

Special Awards

Judges 
 Gabriela Isler – Miss Universe 2013 from Venezuela
 Jeron Teng – Small forward of the De La Salle Green Archers UAAP men's basketball team
 Adam Laker – General Manager of Sofitel Philippine Plaza
 Cory Vidanes – ABS-CBN Corporation Channel Head
 William Christopher – United States' Consul Officer
 Gregory Domingo – Secretary of the Department of Trade and Industry
 Kevin L. Tan – Vice President of Megaworld Corporation
 Korina Sanchez – News Anchor and Chief Correspondent of the ABS-CBN Integrated News and Current Affairs
 Carlo L. Katigbak – President and Chief Executive Officer of Skycable
 Julio Camarena – Mexico's Ambassador to the Philippines
 Juan Edgardo Angara – Incumbent Senator of the Philippines

Contestants
40 contestants competed for the five titles.

Notes

Post-pageant notes 

 Mary Jean Lastimosa competed at Miss Universe 2014 in Doral, Florida and finished as one of the Top 10 finalists.
 Mary Anne Bianca Guidotti competed at Miss International 2014 in Tokyo, Japan where she was unplaced.
 Yvethe Marie Santiago competed at Miss Supranational 2014 in Krynica-Zdroj, Poland where she finished as one of the Top 20 semifinalists.
 Kris Tiffany Janson competed at Miss Intercontinental 2014 in Magdeburg, Germany where she finished as Second Runner-Up. Prior to being called as Second Runner-Up, Janson and Miss Thailand, Patraporn Wang, tied when the supposedly five finalists are being announced, making them six finalists instead of five. Due to this, Janson, together with Wang, both won the Miss Intercontinental Asia & Oceania award.
 Parul Shah competed at Miss Grand International 2015 in Bangkok, Thailand where she finished as Third Runner-Up. Early in the competition, Shah won the Best in National Costume award.
 Both Hannah Ruth Sison and Kimverlyn Suiza competed at Binibining Pilipinas 2015. Sison finished as First Runner-Up, while Suiza finished as Second Runner-Up.
 Pia Wurtzbach also competed at Binibining Pilipinas 2015 where she was crowned Binibining Pilipinas Universe 2015. She competed at Miss Universe 2015 in Las Vegas, Nevada and won. Wurtzbach is the third Miss Universe from the Philippines.
 Nichole Manalo later competed at Binibining Pilipinas 2016 and was crowned Binibining Pilipinas Globe 2016. She competed at Globe 2016 and finished as Third Runner-Up. Initially, Manalo only finished as one of the Top 10 finalists but a week after the pageant, Manalo, together with Natasha Joubert of South Africa, was proclaimed as Third and Fourth Runner-Up respectively. The reason why the Third and Fourth Runners-Up were announced late is that the emcees of the pageant weren't able to read the envelopes in time.
 Laura Lehmann later competed at Miss World Philippines and was crowned Miss World Philippines 2017. She competed at Miss World 2017 in Sanya, China and finished as a Top 40 quarter-finalist. Lehmann is also among the five winners of Beauty with a Purpose, part of the Top 10 for the People's Choice award, and one of the winners of the Head to Head Challenge.

References

External links
 Binibining Pilipinas Official website
 Binibining Pilipinas 2014 Rappler coverage

2014
2014 beauty pageants